Gaultier GAA Club is a Gaelic Athletic Association club located on the outskirts of Dunmore East (An Dún Mór Thoir in Irish) which is a popular tourist and fishing village in County Waterford, Ireland. Situated on the west side of Waterford Harbour on Ireland's southeastern coast, it lies within the barony of Gaultier (Gáll Tír – "foreigners' land" in Irish): a reference to the influx of firstly Viking (Norwegian) and then Norman settlers in the area.  The club is exclusively concerned with Gaelic Football.

Football

History

The Barony of Gaultier consists of the townlands of Passage East, Ballymacaw, Ballygunner, Killea and village of Dunmore East. The present GAA club of the areas concerned came into existence through the amalgamation of Ballymacaw Ramblers and Pierce McCann's of Dunmore. In its inaugural season the club  succeeded in winning the county Junior Football Championship. 

Right through the 1930s and 1940s Gaultier Football Club continued to flourish, even though it failed to get into the ultimate honours arena. In the beginning of the 1950s and in tune with the sweeping under age resurgence taking place in the city, especially the highly successful Juvenile Streets League,  Gaultier people turned their attentions more and more in this direction.

In the early 1980s the underage section of the club really took off in a big way, and for the next decade or so, were rarely, if ever out of the limelight. From a rather humble commencement with the winning of the 1983 County Under 14B title,
In 1990,Gaultier won the County Under 21A title at the expense of  Kilrossanty. Gaultier gained a new status and reputation as an exceptionally talented underage team. 

In 1988 saw the start of an exceptional period for Gaultier when we beat Kilrossanty to claim the first Minor A title. This was followed by further successes in this grade in 89 & 90. The club had achieved the coveted three in a row. At adult level, outright title wins came their way in 1958, when the juniors claimed the second title at the expense of Valley Rovers GAA. The club suffered two County Intermediate defeats at the hands of Tallow and Ballinameela before finally making the breakthrough in 1988. Senior status was our reward for a hard earned victory over Sliabh gCua at Walsh Park on a score line of 5-06 to 2-04.

In 1994 the club reached its first ever senior county final, losing to a strong Nire team. It was another proud day in 1996 when both our seniors and minors contested county finals on the same day. While the seniors went down to Rathgormack, the minors went on to claim another title for the club by overcoming Ardmore in a dramatic end to win by just a point. 

The club was relieved of its senior status after a replay against Ardmore in 2000. For the next few years the club struggled to regain its senior status, coming close on a number of occasions. But in 2004 the club not only won the county intermediate title but also reached the Munster final, where it played Carbery Rangers.

Roll of honour

 Waterford Intermediate Football Championship: 2004, 1988
 Waterford Junior Football Championship: 1929, 1958, 2012, 2020
 Waterford Under-21 Football Championship: 1990, 2016, 2022
 Waterford Minor Football Championship: 1988, 1989, 1990, 1996, 2016, 2019, 2020, 2022
 Waterford Under-16 Football Championship: 1994, 1996, 2008
 Waterford Under-14 Football Championship: 1985
 Waterford Under-12 Football Championship: 1992, 2006

Recent times
The club has contested two Minor A Finals in 2002 and 2005 losing to Ballinacourty and Stradbally respectively.

In 2003 the club surprised many by reaching an Under 21 A Final losing to Ballinacourty. 

The club went through a very successful 2003 season reaching the Munster Intermediate Football Final in 2004 losing to Carbery Rangers. On the way beating Limerick champions Mungret and Tipperary champions Killenaule. 

In the club's first season 2005 in the Waterford Senior Football Championship they reached the Semi-Finals only barely losing out to eventual champions Stradbally.
2006 resulted in a similar defeat to Stradbally at the Quarter Final Stage.

The club won the Under 16 A Championship in 2008 beating Dungarvan by a point in Walsh Park for the first time since 1996.

Progress

External links
 Gaultier Official Website

Gaelic games clubs in County Waterford
Gaelic football clubs in County Waterford